TWF may refer to:

 Thumb Wrestling Federation
 This World Fair, an American rock band
 Magic Valley Regional Airport, an airport serving Twin Falls, Idaho, United States (IATA airport code: TWF)
 Those Who Fear, an American christian metal band
Turkey Wealth Fund

See also
 TWF1
 TWF2